International was a stern-wheel driven steam boat that operated on Kootenay Lake in British Columbia from 1896 to 1908.  International was owned by a Canadian subsidiary of the Great Northern Railway and was involved in sharp competition, including steamboat racing, with similar vessels owned by the Canadian Pacific Railway.

Construction
International was built at the Mirror Lake shipyard just south of Kaslo, British Columbia by James Carson for the International Navigation & Trading Company.  The IN&T's rival, the Columbia and Kootenay Steam Navigation Company had launched the steamer Kokanee in April 1906 at Nelson, prompting IN&T to build International in response.  The frames for International were pre-manufactured and shipped to Mirror Lake, where they arrived in April 1896, and construction began soon afterwards.

Dimensions 
International drew  feet of water.

The overall size of International was 526 gross tons and 281 net tons, with ton in this instance being a measure of volume and not of weight.

The Canadian merchant vessel registry number for International was 103489.  International was licensed to carry 300 passengers.

Engineering 
The engines were manufactured by the Iowa Iron Works Co., of Dubuque, Iowa. The boiler was manufactured by John Inglis and Company, of Ottawa, Ontario.

Career

International was launched in November 1896. Even so, International was raced against other steamers on the lake, and on December 12, 1896, was able to outrun Kokanee by two boat lengths. International was favored by the townspeople of Kaslo, while its rival Kokanee was popular in Nelson. Although International and Kokanee raced on at least two occasions, which of the two was the faster boat was never settled. International also raced against Moyie and Kuskanook

In February 1897, IN&T's time card for International showed a departure time from Kaslo bound for Nelson, at 5:30 a.m., stopping at Ainsworth, Pilot Bay, Balfour and way points.  Returning, International departed Nelson at 4:40 p.m.  Rail connections to Spokane and Northport, Washington, and Rossland, BC were made at Five Mile Point, near Nelson.  The run between Kaslo and Nelson took about two hours.

From 1896 to 1901, International was placed on the route between Nelson, British Columbia and Kaslo.  From 1902 to 1906, International was operated on the same run, but as a relief vessel for the newer steamer Kaslo.

In 1898, the Great Northern Railway organized a Canadian subsidiary, the Kootenay Railway and Navigation Company.  KR&N took over the operations of IN&T, including the International.  In 1906 International was rebuilt at the Mirror Lake shipyard.

From 1906 to 1908 International returned to the Kaslo-Nelson route, as the primary vessel.

Disposition
.
At about the same time, the Great Northern began to wind up its operations in the Kootenay region, and other than Kaslo, very little maintenance was done on its boats after 1906.

In 1909 International’s boiler failed.  The boiler was removed in 1910.  The new boiler was never delivered, and International was never returned to service.  When KR&N ceased operations, International was taken to Mirror Lake and beached.  In March 1912 International was sold to Gus Mathew for use as a tourist lodge at Riondel, British Columbia.  International lay derelict at Riondel for many years, and was finally destroyed by fire in 1952.

Notes

References 
 
  
 
 

  

Paddle steamers of British Columbia
Steamboats of Kootenay Lake
Ships built in British Columbia
1896 ships
Passenger ships of Canada